Washakie Needles is the highest peak in the Washakie Range in the U.S. state of Wyoming. Washakie Needles is in the Washakie Wilderness of Shoshone National Forest. The Washakie Range is one of the southern group of mountains within the Absaroka Range, the other being the Owl Creek Mountains. Part of the Absaroka volcanic field, the dacites that comprise the summit needles or pillars on Washakie Needles have been dated at 38.8 million years old, and are the youngest volcanic rocks associated with the Absarokas.

References

Mountains of Hot Springs County, Wyoming
Mountains of Wyoming
Shoshone National Forest